United States Marine Forces, South (also known as USMARFORSOUTH), headquartered in Miami, Florida, is the U.S. Marine Corps component of the U.S. Southern Command.

References

External links

Marine Forces South Website

Military units and formations in Florida